William Mundala (born December 4, 1999 in Bondy), known by his stage name Tiakola, is a French rapper and singer, a member of the group 4Keus before the group was put aside for the launch of his own career.

Biography 
Of Congolese origin, Tiakola was born in Bondy, a city of 4000, and grew up there. He is the last of eight siblings.

In 2019, without leaving his group, Tiakola embarked on a solo career with the title Sombre Mélodie, taken from the CRCLR Mouvement compilation. Subsequently, he was invited for collaborations by artists such as Dadju, Franglish, Leto or Gazo and then returned solo in 2021 with the track Pousse-toi.

On 27 May 2022, he released his first album Mélo containing 16 tracks (20 in the physical versions) including collaborations with rappers Hamza, Gazo, Niska, SDM and Rsko.

Discography

Album

Singles

References

External links 
 TIakola on Discogs
 Tiakola on MusicBrainz

1999 births
French rappers
French singers
French singer-songwriters
Living people
Rappers from Paris